Century Aluminum Company is a US-based producer of primary aluminium, with aluminum plants in Kentucky, South Carolina and Iceland. It is the largest producer of primary aluminium in the United States. The company is a publicly held corporation listed on the NASDAQ. The headquarters is at One South Wacker in Chicago.

History
Since it was formed in 1995, Century has significantly expanded its operations through acquisitions and capital expansion projects and today operates primary aluminum smelters in Kentucky, South Carolina and Iceland.  Century became publicly listed on NASDAQ in 1996.

Operations
The company operates three aluminium smelters in the US, and one in Iceland. Construction of a fifth smelter in Iceland has been halted since 2009.  All Century's operations produce primary aluminium, that is, aluminium from ore, rather than from aluminum scrap.  In 2014, the company produced 881,000 metric tons of aluminium.

 Hawesville, Kentucky
 Robards, Kentucky
 Mount Holly, South Carolina
 Grundartangi, Hvalfjarðarsveit, Iceland
 Helguvik, Reykjanesbær, Iceland (construction halted)

As of late 2015, Century was suffering from low aluminium prices, and threatened to close its South Carolina plant, and lay off 600 workers, if it did not obtain less expensive electricity. Century made an agreement with Santee Cooper Power in December 2015, under which it would run the Mount Holly smelter at half capacity. Century had permanently closed their Ravesnwood, West Virginia plant in 2017 with a loss of 650 jobs due to high energy costs and cited the same reason in announcing the closure of one of its Kentucky operations.

Citations

See also
 Aluminium industry in the United States

External links
 Century Aluminum website

Aluminum companies of the United States
Manufacturing companies based in Chicago
Companies listed on the Nasdaq
1996 initial public offerings